This article attempts to conveniently list articles on some of the most useful coordinate charts in some of the most useful examples of Riemannian manifolds.

The notion of a coordinate chart is fundamental to various notions of a manifold which are used in mathematics.
In order of increasing level of structure:
topological manifold
smooth manifold
Riemannian manifold and semi-Riemannian manifold
For our purposes, the key feature of the last two examples is that we have defined a metric tensor which we can use to integrate along a curve, such as a geodesic curve.  The key difference between Riemannian metrics and semi-Riemannian metrics is that the former arise from bundling positive-definite quadratic forms, whereas the latter arise from bundling indefinite quadratic forms.

A four-dimensional semi-Riemannian manifold is often called a Lorentzian manifold, because these provide the mathematical setting for metric theories of gravitation such as general relativity.

For many topics in applied mathematics, mathematical physics, and engineering, it is important to be able to write the most important partial differential equations of mathematical physics
heat equation
Laplace equation
wave equation
(as well as variants of this basic triad) in various coordinate systems which are adapted to any symmetries which may be present.  While this may be how many students first encounter a non-Cartesian coordinate chart, such as the cylindrical chart on E3 (three-dimensional Euclidean space), it turns out that these charts are useful for many other purposes, such as writing down interesting vector fields, congruences of curves, or frame fields in a convenient way.

Listing commonly encountered coordinate charts unavoidably involves some real and apparent overlap, for at least two reasons:
many charts exist in all (sufficiently large) dimensions, but perhaps only for certain families of manifolds such as spheres,
many charts most commonly encountered for specific manifolds, such as spheres, actually can be used (with an appropriate metric tensor) for more general manifolds, such as spherically symmetric manifolds.
Therefore, seemingly any attempt to organize them into a list involves multiple overlaps, which we have accepted in this list in order to be able to offer a convenient if messy reference.

We emphasize that this list is far from exhaustive.

Favorite surfaces

Here are some charts which (with appropriate metric tensors) can be used in the stated classes of Riemannian and semi-Riemannian surfaces:

isothermal chart
Radially symmetric surfaces:
polar chart
Surfaces embedded in E3:
Monge chart
Certain minimal surfaces:
asymptotic chart (see also asymptotic line)

Here are some charts on some of the most useful Riemannian surfaces (note that there is some overlap, since many charts of S2 have closely analogous charts on H2; in such cases, both are discussed in the same article):

Euclidean plane E2:
Cartesian chart
Maxwell chart
Sphere S2:
polar chart (arc length radial chart)
stereographic chart
central projection chart
axial projection chart
Mercator chart
Hyperbolic plane H2:
polar chart
stereographic chart (Poincaré model)
upper half space chart (another Poincaré model)
central projection chart (Klein model)
Mercator chart

Favorite semi-Riemannian surface:

AdS2 (or S1,1) and dS2 (or H1,1):
central projection
equatorial trig
Note: the difference between these two surfaces is in a sense merely a matter of convention, according to whether we consider either the cyclic or the non-cyclic coordinate to be timelike; in higher dimensions the distinction is less trivial.

Favorite Riemannian three-manifolds

Here are some charts which (with appropriate metric tensors) can be used in the stated classes of three-dimensional Riemannian manifolds:

Diagonalizable manifolds:
isothermal chart
(Note: not every three manifold admits an isothermal chart.)

Axially symmetric manifolds:
cylindrical chart
parabolic chart
hyperbolic chart
prolate spheroidal chart (rational and trigonometric forms)
oblate spheroidal chart (rational and trigonometric forms)
toroidal chart

Here are some charts which can be used on some of the most useful Riemannian three-manifolds:

Three-dimensional Euclidean space E3:
cartesian
polar spherical chart
cylindrical chart
elliptical cylindrical, hyperbolic cylindrical, parabolic cylindrical charts
parabolic chart
hyperbolic chart
prolate spheroidal chart (rational and trigonometric forms)
oblate spheroidal chart (rational and trigonometric forms)
toroidal chart
Cassini toroidal chart and Cassini bipolar chart
Three-sphere S3
polar chart
stereographic chart
Hopf chart
Hyperbolic three-space H3
polar chart
upper half space chart (Poincaré model)
Hopf chart

A few higher-dimensional examples

Sn
Hopf chart
Hn
upper half space chart (Poincaré model)
Hopf chart

Omitted examples

There are of course many important and interesting examples of Riemannian and semi-Riemannian manifolds which are not even mentioned here, including:
Bianchi groups: there is a short list (up to local isometry) of three-dimensional real Lie groups, which when considered as Riemannian-three manifolds give homogeneous but (usually) non-isotropic geometries.
other noteworthy real Lie groups,
Lorentzian manifolds which (perhaps with some added structure such as a scalar field) serve as solutions to the field equations of various metric theories of gravitation, in particular general relativity.  There is some overlap here; in particular:
axisymmetric spacetimes such as Weyl vacuums possess various charts discussed here; the prolate spheroidal chart turns out to be particularly useful,
de Sitter models in cosmology are, as manifolds, nothing other than H1,3 and as such possess numerous interesting and useful charts modeled after ones listed here.

In addition, one can certainly consider coordinate charts on complex manifolds, perhaps with metrics which arise from bundling Hermitian forms.  Indeed, this natural generalization is just the tip of iceberg. However, these generalizations are best dealt with in more specialized lists.

See also

Metric tensor
List of mathematics lists, particularly:
List of multivariable calculus topics
List of Fourier analysis topics
List of differential geometry topics

Coordinate charts